Rhodesleigh, also known as the Rhodes Mansion, is a historic residence in Lakewood, Washington. Architects involved in its design included Ambrose J. Russell and Frederick Heath.

The house is located at 10815 Greendale Drive, built in 1922. The Rhodes Brothers were involved in the retail trade and had Rhodes department stores in Tacoma and other areas. The business was established in 1892 as a coffee shop in downtown Tacoma by Albert, William, Henry, and Charles Rhodes.

The  1921 house with its 8+ bedrooms and 7+ bathrooms was on sale in 2009 for $3.4 million. Its carriage house (built later in 1941) at 10914 Greendale was also up for sale. It is located on Lake Steilacoom. According to the broker's website it was built in memory of Edward Rhodes "who served and paid the ultimate sacrifice in World War I".

See also
Rhodes House (Tacoma)

References

Houses completed in 1922
National Register of Historic Places in Tacoma, Washington
Houses in Pierce County, Washington
Lakewood, Washington
Frederick Heath buildings
Houses on the National Register of Historic Places in Washington (state)